Hold That Pose is a 1950 American animated cartoon produced by Walt Disney Productions and released by RKO Radio Pictures. The film's plot centers on Goofy trying to get a job as a wildlife photographer but ending up causing trouble in a grizzly bear's pen at a zoo. This is Humphrey the Bear's debut appearance.

Plot
The narrator explains that when you get bored or constantly have unsatisfying days, you need a hobby - in Goofy's case, photography. Goofy goes to a store to get some cameras and in his basement goes to unload them and insert the film. The narrator explains that there are two types of film: roll film and cut film. When Goofy gets the film all loaded in, the narrator says that he should pick a task such as wildlife watching. Goofy goes to the grizzly bear habitat at a zoo to photograph Humphrey the Bear. Slight gags show Goofy to be an inept photographer, waking Humphrey up, putting a cape over Humphrey's head, taking pictures right in his face, and creating a small volcano that blows up on Humphrey. The last straw comes when Goofy takes a picture of Humphrey's dinner with his family. The angered bear chases Goofy out of the zoo, across town, through a stage and back to Goofy's apartment via a taxi (with Humphrey as the driver). The bear chases Goofy up the stairs, and finally into Goofy's apartment and closet where Goofy is mauled. However, Humphrey calms down after Goofy shows him his pictures, and when Humphrey goes on vacation he takes them with himself to show them to tourists.

Home media
The short was released on December 2, 2002, on Walt Disney Treasures: The Complete Goofy and on the "Walt Disney's Classic Cartoon Favorites Starring Goofy" Volume 3.

See also
 Rugged Bear
 Grin and Bear It
 Bearly Asleep 
 Beezy Bear
 Hooked Bear
 In the Bag

References

External links
 

1950s Disney animated short films
1950 short films
1950 animated films
Films about photographers
Films directed by Jack Kinney
Films produced by Walt Disney
Films set in zoos
Goofy (Disney) short films
Films scored by Paul Smith (film and television composer)
1950s English-language films
American animated short films
RKO Pictures short films
RKO Pictures animated short films
Animated films about dogs
Animated films about bears